Vladimir Aleksandrovich Parnyakov (born 30 January 1984) is a Russian former professional football player right midfielder. He plays for FC Dynamo Vologda.

External links
 

1984 births
People from Vologda
Living people
Russian footballers
Association football midfielders
FC Orenburg players
FC Tyumen players
Russian Premier League players
FC Dynamo Vologda players
FC Spartak Kostroma players
Footballers from Vologda